is a 2009 Japanese drama film directed by Isao Yukisada.

Cast
Tatsuya Fujiwara as Naoki Ihara
Karina Nose as Mirai Soma
Shihori Kanjiya as Kotomi Okochi
Win Morisaki as Makoto
Kento Hayashi as Satoru Kokubo
Keisuke Koide as Ryosuke Sugimoto

External links

2009 drama films
2009 films
Films directed by Isao Yukisada
Japanese drama films
2000s Japanese films